Matías Alejo Linas (born 8 June 1993) is an Argentine professional footballer who plays as a forward for Deportivo Armenio.

Career
Linas is a product of Lanús' system. His only involvement with their first-team arrived in June 2012 when he was an unused substitute for a goalless draw with Newell's Old Boys in the Primera División. In July 2014, Linas was loaned to Los Andes in Primera B Metropolitana. Three substitute appearances followed in 2014, which concluded with promotion to Primera B Nacional. He remained on loan for the succeeding season, scoring on his first start on 1 August 2015 versus Juventud Unida. Los Andes signed Linas permanently in 2016. Sixteen goals came across his next sixty-nine games, including a hat-trick over Villa Dálmine.

Career statistics
.

References

External links

1993 births
Living people
People from Lanús Partido
Argentine footballers
Association football forwards
Primera B Metropolitana players
Primera Nacional players
Club Atlético Lanús footballers
Club Atlético Los Andes footballers
Club Atlético Brown footballers
Deportivo Armenio footballers
Sportspeople from Buenos Aires Province